Gibsonia may refer to:  
Gibsonia, Pennsylvania, an unincorporated community in Pennsylvania
Gibsonia, Florida, a census-designated place in Polk County, Florida
The works by William Gibson, a late 20th-century/early 21st-century speculative fiction author
Gibsonia, a genus of Fungi, published in 1909